The Horowitz family is a Levitical Ashkenazi rabbinic family, who are among the most prominent rabbinic families in Europe and are generally considered to possess the oldest and best recorded Levitical pedigree. The family chiefly descends from R. Joseph HaLevi who settled in Hořovice, Bohemia ( or ) in 1391 and adopted the surname "Ish-Horowitz".

From the 16th-century and onward, the family dominated the Prague community and formed marriage alliances with other prestigious families. They later spread out to Eastern European communities and produced numerous rabbis and communal leaders. Following the rise of the Haskalah, the family produced several writers of the Enlightenment, scholars, musicians, and scientists.

Origins 
The Horowitz family preserved a tradition that R. Joseph HaLevi of Hořovice was originally from Girona, Spain and was a direct paternal descendant of R. Zerachiah HaLevi of Girona. R. Zerachiah himself was a descendant of the Yizhari family of Girona who claimed paternal descendant from Heman the Singer who as the grandson of the Prophet Samuel who in part was a direct paternal descendant of Yizhar son of Kehath son of Levi, who is the eponymous ancestor of the Yizhari family of Girona.

The Horowitz family have traditionally had an affinity to their patriarch, the Prophet Samuel such as R. Shmuel Shmelke Horowitz of Nikolsburg (1726–1778) who famously said on his deathbed "You should know that my soul is that of the Prophet Samuel. Proof of this is that my name, like the prophet's, is Samuel. The prophet was a Levi, and so am I. The Prophet Samuel lived to be 52 years, and I am today 52 years old. Only the prophet was called Samuel, but I have remained Shmelke."

Early history 

With the growth of the Jewish community in Prague and the Bohemian Diet passing land rights reform in 1501, allowing for more real estate in the city to be built and owned by Jews, the Horowitz family sold their holdings in Hořovice and moved to Prague in the early 16th century, taking on the Horowitz surname.

R. Joseph of Hořovice's son, R. Aaron Meshullam Horowitz, built the Pinkas Synagogue in Prague and had eight children who later became the foundation of the Horowitz family. Members of the family such as R. Shabtai Sheftel Horowitz (1565–1619) and R. Isaiah Horowitz (1555–1630) later left Prague and settled in the Polish–Lithuanian Commonwealth with the latter, R. Isaiah, holding rabbinic posts in Dubno and Ostróg, finally settling in Tiberias where he died thus sparking a kabbalistic revival in sixteenth-century Palestine.

R. Isaiah was a disciple of R. Moses Isserles and thus helped to spread his Talmudic approach throughout Europe with many members of the Horowitz family marrying members of the Isserles family. R. Isaiah authored the work Shenei Luḥot HaBerit, which later become a principle work of European Kabbalah. His son R. Shabbethai Horowitz (1590–1660) was a prominent talmudist and rabbinic figure in Ostroh, Fürth, Frankfurt am Main and Vienna.

Later history

Hasidism 
One particularly prominent branch of the family descends from R. Meir Horowitz (1656–1746), known as the "Maharam of Tiktin". Both his grandsons R. Shmuel Shmelke Horowitz of Nikolsburg (1726–1778) and R. Pinchas Horowitz of Frankfurt (1731–1805) where disciples of R. Dov Ber of Mezeritch and established the Horowitz family as leading figures in the rise of Hasidism.

R. Pinchas's son R. Tzvi Hirsch Horowitz succeeded him as Chief Rabbi of Frankfurt and authored the work "Macheneh Levi".

R. Shmelke had two sons, his eldest son R. Zevi Joshua Horowitz (1760–1816) authored the work "Hiddushei ha-Ribash" and is the progenitor of the Nikolsburg Hasidic dynasty which includes the Boston Hasidic dynasty founded by R. Zevi Joshua's descendant R. Pinchas David Horowitz (1876–1941) in 1915. His descendants include the second Bostoner Rebbe, R. Levi Yitzchak Horowitz (1921–2009), his son's R. Mayer Alter Horowitz and R. Naftali Yehuda Horowitz and his nephew R. Chaim Avrohom Horowitz (1933–2016) and his nephew's son R. Yaakov Yitzchak Horowitz. 

Another descendant of R. Zevi Joshua is R. Elijah Horowitz-Winogradow (1842–1878) who served as the Hasidic rabbi of Lida and had several descendants and family members who became prominent members of the Haskalah such as his grandson, the Polish artist Aleksander Żyw. R. Elijah's sister, Leah is an ancestor of the Beloff family which include Max Beloff, Baron Beloff (1913–1999), Renee Beloff (1916–1998), Leah Nora Beloff (1919–1997), John Beloff (1920–2006) and Anne Ethel Beloff-Chain, Lady Chain (1921–1991).

R. Shmelke's younger son R. Jacob Horowitz (1765–1805) immigrated to Hungary and is ancestor of Regina Horowitz-Margareten (1863–1959) who founded Horowitz-Margareten Matzohs which is now one of the largest Matzoh companies in North America.

R. Meir's grandson, R. Isaac Horowitz of Hamburg (1715–1767) was the maternal grandfather of R. Naftali Zvi Horowitz (nee Rubin) (1760–1827) who adopted his mother's maiden name and founded the Ropshitz Hasidic dynasty, which includes the Melitz Hasidic dynasty and Linsk Hasidic dynasty. R. Meir's great-grandson was R. Yisrael Friedman of Ruzhin who is the progenitor of the Bohush, Boyan, Chortkov, Husiatyn, Sadigura, and Shtefanesh Hasidic dynasties.

Other members of the family also achieved great prominence in Hasidic circles such as R. Yaakov Yitzchak Horowitz of Lublin (1745–1815) who is a progenitor of the Chentshin Hasidic dynasty and R. Aaron Horowitz who founded the Strashelye Hasidic dynasty. For this reason, the founder of Hasidism, the Baal Shem Tov, considered the Horowitz family to be one of the three families of pure lineage in the Jewish nation holding the position of Levites, the other two being the Rappaport family, who are Kohanim, and the Spira family, who are Israelites.

Non-Hassidic Rabbis 
R. Moshe Meshullam Horowitz (1832–1894) was a rabbi in Galicia.

R. Yosef Yozel Horwitz (1847–1919), was an important rabbi in the Musar movement, founding seventy yeshivos across Eastern Europe. Of those yeshivos, many followed his unique style of mussar; the first one of these was founded in Novogrudok, giving the style the name "Novhardok mussar", and Rabbi Horwitz the name "The Alter of Novhardok."

Haskalah 
Following the rise of the Haskalah many members of the family became prominent writers, musicians and scientists such as the Russian composer Vladimir Horowitz (1903–1989), the Yiddish playwright Moses Horowitz (1844–1910), the Bohemian Yiddish author Bella Horwitz, the German chess master, Bernhard Horwitz (1807–1885), the American surgeon Phineas Jonathan Horwitz (1822–1904), the German mathematician Adolf Hurwitz (1859–1919), the English professor Hyman Hurwitz (1770–1844) and the Polish mathematician Witold Hurewicz (1904–1956).

DNA 
In 2016 historian and genealogist Edward Gelles established through Autosomal DNA the traditional belief concerning the descent of the Levitic Horowitz lines from the Yizhari family of Girona. In 2017 the journal Scientific Reports confirmed that the genealogical records for three of the individuals with the Horowitz surname converged to a common male ancestor born at 1615 CE or 402 ybp.

References

External links 
 A detailed Horowitz family tree prepared by Michael Honey.
 A Horowitz family tree prepared by the Jews of Frankfurt DNA Project
 The Horowitz family association
 The Horowitz-Margareten family association

Czech families
Jewish families
Rabbinic dynasties